Jorie Remus (born March 17, 1929, in New York, NY) was a comedian who was most associated with The Purple Onion in San Francisco in the 1950s. Her act helped inspire Phyllis Diller and she helped discover Maya Angelou.

Remus performed at the Purple Onion and the hungry i. Her routine was performed while sitting on a piano like a chanteuse and talking about the challenges a modern woman faced on the dating scene.

Phyllis Diller was a fan of Remus' before becoming a comedian. One night while watching Remus perform, Diller's husband Sherwood commented that Phyllis was funnier. Lloyd Clark, a performance coach, overheard the comment and worked with Diller, eventually getting her an audition at the Purple Onion. Diller assumed much of Remus' style, but added her own controlled lunacy.

Remus saw a singer named Marguerite Johnson sing the song "Run Joe" at the Garden of Allah and hired her to perform at the Purple Onion, working with her to help her become a professional and provided her with the name Maya Angelou. Angelou studied Remus' singing and comedy to learn how to hold an audience. Once Angelou was established at the Purple Onion, Remus traveled to New York to appear at the Blue Angel, helping to complete a bicoastal comedy circuit between San Francisco and New York. After finishing her appearance at the Blue Angel, Remus founded a short-lived New York based version of the Purple Onion called Jorie's Purple Onion, where the performers included Remus, Barbara McNair and Will Holt.

Despite her influence, Remus' career did not last long. Following appearances on Tonight Starring Jack Paar and The Phil Silvers Show in 1958, she continued to appear in nightclubs through the early 60s and then disappeared for several years. She moved to Hawaii and eventually turned up on several episodes of Hawaii 5-0 in the 1970s. Her last acting credit was on Magnum, P.I. in 1982.

Personal life
Remus was married to Allan Murray, but they were divorced in Puerto Rico, where Remus founded the night club the Gilded Cage, in June, 1961.

References

External links
 

1929 births
20th-century American comedians
American stand-up comedians
American television actresses
American women comedians
Comedians from New York City
20th-century American actresses
Living people
21st-century American women